The Communauté de communes du Canton de Nouvion is a former communauté de communes in the Somme département and in the Hauts-de-France région of France. It was created in December 1996. It was merged into the new Communauté de communes du Ponthieu-Marquenterre in January 2017.

Composition 
This Communauté de communes included 17 communes:

Agenvillers
Buigny-Saint-Maclou
Canchy
Domvast
Forest-l'Abbaye
Forest-Montiers
Gapennes
Hautvillers-Ouville
Lamotte-Buleux
Le Titre
Millencourt-en-Ponthieu
Neuilly-l'Hôpital
Nouvion
Noyelles-sur-Mer
Ponthoile
Port-le-Grand
Sailly-Flibeaucourt

See also 
Communes of the Somme department

References 

Nouvion